Jordan de Freitas Viana (born July 3, 1966) is a Brazilian football manager.

He played for Cruzeiro Esporte Clube, Tupi, Grêmio Maringá and Flamengo de Varginha.

He coached Equatorial Guinea in Africa between 2000 and 2001.

References

External links
Jordan de Freitas Facebook official profile

1966 births
Living people
Brazilian footballers
Brazilian football managers
Association football midfielders
Tombense Futebol Clube managers
Tupi Football Club managers